Brookside Historic District is a national historic district located at Aurora, Preston County, West Virginia.  It encompasses 11 contributing buildings, 1 contributing structure, and 1 contributing site in the small community of Aurora.  There are five properties included: Brookside Inn/Gaymont (c. 1895), the Brookside Cottages (c. 1885), Cathedral State Park, Brookside Farm (c. 1895-1905), and the Red Horse Tavern (1825).  The community was an important example of a turn-of-the-20th century rural retreat with farm. Owners of the resort took advantage of its location close to the Baltimore and Ohio Railroad and created a respite from the city heat for residents of Washington, Baltimore, Cleveland and other cities.

It was listed on the National Register of Historic Places in 2013.

References

Historic districts in Preston County, West Virginia
Buildings and structures in Preston County, West Virginia
National Register of Historic Places in Preston County, West Virginia
Historic districts on the National Register of Historic Places in West Virginia